Country Roads is a Canadian country music television series which aired on CBC Television in 1973.

Premise
Ronnie Prophet hosted this Toronto-produced series filled in the time slot of The Tommy Hunter Show between seasons. It combined the performances new Canadian country musicians with humorous segments. Comedy characters included puppets Harold the Frog and Yackie Duck which were created by John and Alison Vandergun and voiced by Prophet. The rural newspaper publisher, Granny Slanders, was portrayed by comedian Gwen Neighbour. Regular segments of each episode included the "New Song Spot", "The Grease Spot" which featured rockabilly songs and "It's Cryin' Time Again" which featured country songs with sad themes.

Scheduling
This hour-long series was broadcast on Fridays at 9:00 p.m. (Eastern) from 10 August to 14 September 1973.

References

External links
 
 

CBC Television original programming
1973 Canadian television series debuts
1973 Canadian television series endings
Television shows filmed in Toronto